Both naturally and artificially occurring pine species (Pinus) can hybridize, combining their genetic material and sometimes creating hybrids that can be more or less vigorous than their parent species. An example of a naturally occurring hybrid pine is Pinus × sondereggeri, a naturally occurring cross between loblolly pine (P. taeda) and longleaf pine (P. palustris). An example of the many artificial hybrids is Pinus lambertiana × P. armandii.

Subgenus Pinus 
Includes both natural and artificial pine hybrids.

Subsection Pinus 
Pinus nigra × P. resinosa – Austrian pine × red pine

Pinus densiflora × P. nigra – Japanese Red pine × Austrian pine

Pinus × densithunbergii, Pinus densiflora × P. thunbergii – Japanese Red pine × Japanese black pine

Pinus × neilreichiana, Pinus nigra × P. sylvestris – Neilreich pine (Austrian pine × Scots pine)

Pinus × rhaetica, Pinus mugo × P. sylvestris – Rhætic pine (Mountain pine × Scots pine)

Subsection Ponderosae 
Pinus ponderosa var. ponderosa × P. arizonica – Ponderosa pine (typical variety) × Arizona pine

Pinus ponderosa var. ponderosa × P. montezumae – Ponderosa pine (typical variety) × Montezuma pine

Pinus ponderosa var. scopulorum × P. montezumae – Rocky Mountain ponderosa pine × Montezuma pinePinus engelmannii × P. montezumae – Apache pine × Montezuma pinePinus jeffreyi × P. montezumae – Jeffrey pine × Montezuma pinePinus ponderosa var. ponderosa × P. engelmannii – Ponderosa pine (typical variety) × Apache pinePinus engelmannii × P. arizonica – Apache pine × Arizona pinePinus engelmannii × P. ponderosa var. scopulorum – Apache pine × Rocky Mountain ponderosa pinePinus jeffreyi × P. ponderosa var. ponderosa – Jeffrey pine × ponderosa pine (typical variety)Pinus jeffreyi × P. ponderosa var. scopulorum – Jeffrey pine × Rocky Mountain ponderosa pinePinus jeffreyi × P. ponderosa var. washoensis – Jeffrey pine × Washoe pinePinus. ponderosa var. washoensis × P. ponderosa var. ponderosa – Washoe pine × ponderosa pine (typical variety)Pinus. ponderosa var. washoensis × P. ponderosa var. scopulorum – Washoe pine × Rocky Mountain ponderosa pinePinus jeffreyi × P. coulteri – Jeffrey pine × Coulter pine

 Subsection Contortae Pinus × murraybanksiana, Pinus contorta var. murrayana × P. banksiana – Murraybanks pine (Sierra lodgepole pine × jack pine)Pinus contorta var latifolia × P. banksiana – Rocky Mountain Lodgepole Pine × Jack PinePinus virginiana × P. clausa – Virginia pine × Sand pine

 Subsection Australes Pinus × sondereggeri, Pinus palustris × P. taeda – Sonderegger's pine (Longleaf pine × loblolly pine)Pinus elliottii × P. palustris – Slash pine × longleaf pinePinus elliottii × P. taeda – Slash pine × loblolly pinePinus echinata × P. elliottii – Shortleaf pine × slash pinePinus echinata × P. taeda – Shortleaf pine × loblolly pinePinus pungens × P. echinata – Table Mountain pine × shortleaf pinePinus rigida × P. echinata – Pitch pine × shortleaf pinePinus x rigitaeda, Pinus rigida × P. taeda – Pitlolly pine (Pitch pine × loblolly pine) 
 Pinus rigida × P. serotina – Pitch pine × pond pinePinus patula × P. greggii – Mexican weeping pine × Gregg pinePinus patula × P. radiata – Mexican weeping pine × Monterey pinePinus attenuata × P. radiata – KMX pine (Knobcone pine × Monterey pine)Pinus attenuata × P. muricata – Knobcone pine × bishop pine

 Subgenus Strobus 

Includes both natural and artificial pine hybrids. There have been external reports of pine hybrids in the subgenus Strobus.

 Subsection Cembroides Pinus quadrifolia × P. monophylla subsp. californiarum – Parry pinyon × California single-leaf pinyon Pinus quadrifolia × P. monophylla – Parry pinyon × single-leaf pinyonPinus monophylla × P. edulis – Single-leaf pinyon × Colorado pinyon

 Subsection Strobus 

Pinus pumila × P. sibirica<ref name=":2">{{Cite web |last1=Goroshkevich |first1=Sergej N. |title=Natural Hybridization between Russian Stone Pine (Pinus siberica) and Japanese Stone Pine (Pinus pumila') |url=https://www.fs.fed.us/rm/pubs/rmrs_p032/rmrs_p032_169_171.pdf |access-date=2022-03-24 |publisher=US Forest Service |date=2004 |language=en}}</ref> – Japanese stone pine × Siberian pine

Pinus × hakkodensis, Pinus parviflora var. pentaphylla × P. pumila – Hakkoda pine (Japanese white pine × Japanese stone pine)

Pinus × holfordiana, Pinus ayacahuite × P. wallichiana – Holford pine (Mexican white pine × Himalayan pine)

 Pinus × hunnewellii, Pinus parviflora × P. strobus – Hunnewell's white pine (Japanese white pine × eastern white pine)

 Pinus monticola × P. parviflora – Western white pine × Japanese white pine

Pinus lambertiana × P. armandii – Sugar pine × Armand pine

Pinus lambertiana × P. koraiensis – Sugar pine × Korean pine

Pinus monticola × P. strobiformis – Western white pine × southwestern white pine

Pinus monticola × P. flexilis – Western white pine × limber pine

Pinus monticola × P. strobus – Western white pine × eastern white pine

Pinus monticola × P. peuce – Western white pine × Balkan pine

Pinus peuce × P. strobus – Balkan pine × eastern white pine

Pinus peuce × P. parviflora – Balkan pine × Japanese white pine

Pinus flexilis × P. wallichiana – Limber pine × Himalayan pine

Pinus flexilis × P. strobus – Limber pine × eastern white pine

Pinus flexilis × P. ayacahuite – Limber pine × Mexican white pine

Pinus ayacahuite × P. strobus – Mexican white pine × eastern white pine

Pinus × schwerinii, Pinus strobus × P. wallichiana – Schwerin's white pine (Eastern white pine × Himalayan pine)

Pinus monticola × P. wallichiana – Western white pine × Himalayan pine

Pinus cembra × P. sibirica – Swiss stone pine × Siberian pine

Pinus cembra × P. albicaulis – Swiss stone pine × whitebark pine

Pinus albicaulis × P. flexilis – Whitebark pine × limber pine

Pinus sibirica × P. cembra – Siberian pine × Swiss stone pine

Pinus sibirica × P. koraiensis – Siberian pine × Korean pine

Pinus armandii × P. koraiensis – Armand pine × Korean pine

Pinus strobus × P. ayacahuite – Eastern white pine × Mexican white pine

References 

Lists of plant species